This is the discography of Sam Sneed, an American record producer and rapper . For song-writing credits, see Sam Sneed production discography.

Sam Sneed planned to release an Album with his Group Street Scholars In 1996 
Lady Heroin was meant to be a single for the album, even a music video was shot for it  but was later remixed and put on the Gridlock'd (soundtrack) this time with J-Flexx and The Lady of Rage[].

Albums

Studio

Singles

Solo

References

Sneed, Sam
Discographies of American artists